Ricardo Daniel Caruso Lombardi (born 10 February 1962 in Buenos Aires) is an Argentine football manager, currently in charge of Deportivo Español, and former footballer. He is best known for saving teams from being relegated to second division.

Playing career 

Lombardi started his playing career with Argentinos Juniors in 1981. His career was then mostly in the lower leagues of Argentine football apart from 1984 when he played a single season for Club Atlético Atlanta in the Primera Division.

In 1986, he was part of the Deportivo Italiano team that won the Primera B championship.

Managerial career 

After retirement, Caruso Lombardi took up coaching, initially in lower league teams. In the 1995–96 season, he won the Primera B Metropolitana (third division) with Sportivo Italiano, and in the 2004–05 he won it again with Tigre.

Caruso Lombardi was then in charge of Argentinos Juniors, until resigning five games into the 2007 Apertura tournament, despite his team's 3–2 win over Boca Juniors only three weeks previously. He was then hired by Newell's Old Boys, with which he obtained his second victory over Boca in the same 2007 Apertura tournament, beating them 1–0.

On 24 February 2009, Caruso Lombardi became Racing Club's head coach, signing a two-year contract. He helped Racing avoid relegation in his first season; however, he resigned on October 2009, after coaching 11 games without a win in the Apertura tournament. After three years, on 17 December 2009, the coach returned to Tigre, replacing Diego Cagna.

Caruso Lombardi has a preference towards using physically tall footballers on all the positions of the field. In 2010, while coaching Tigre, he was accused by one of his players (Juan Camilo Angulo) of requesting a bribe to put him on the first team. The coach denied the truth of the accusations.

On 8 March 2011, Caruso Lombardi was appointed as head coach of Quilmes, with the club languishing at the bottom of the table and fighting relegation. It is expected that he would remain in that role until his contract expired in June 2012. After a successful spell at Quilmes, during the night of 3 April of the next season, he signed a contract with San Lorenzo de Almagro, replacing Leonardo Madelón in the charge, after their bad results.

On 26 February 2019, Lombardi was appointed as the manager of San Martín Tucumán.

Honours

Player 
Deportivo Italiano
Primera B: 1985–1986

Manager 
Deportivo Italiano
Primera B Metropolitana: 1995–1996

Tigre
Primera B Metropolitana: 2004–2005

References

External links
 
 

Living people
1962 births
Footballers from Buenos Aires
Argentine footballers
Argentinos Juniors footballers
Club Atlético Atlanta footballers
Club Almagro players
Defensores de Belgrano footballers
Argentine Primera División players
Argentine football managers
All Boys managers
Club Atlético Platense managers
Club Atlético Tigre managers
Argentinos Juniors managers
Newell's Old Boys managers
San Lorenzo de Almagro managers
Racing Club de Avellaneda managers
Defensores de Belgrano managers
Quilmes Atlético Club managers
Estudiantes de Buenos Aires managers
Arsenal de Sarandí managers
Club Atlético Sarmiento managers
Club Atlético Huracán managers
Association football midfielders